Elections were held in January and June 1920 for the various county and district councils of Ireland. The elections were organised by the Dublin Castle administration under the law of the then United Kingdom of Great Britain and Ireland (UK), and held while the Irish War of Independence was pitting UK forces against those of the Irish Republic proclaimed in 1919 by the First Dáil. Elections were held in two stages: borough and urban district councils in January; and county and rural district councils in June. Sinn Féin, which had established the First Dáil, won control of many of the councils, which subsequently broke contact with Dublin Castle's Local Government Board for Ireland and instead recognised the republican Department of Local Government. The election results provide historians with a barometer of public opinion in what would be the last elections administered on an all-island basis: the Government of Ireland Act 1920 passed at the end of the year effected the partition of Ireland from 1921, though the elections for the two home rule Parliaments envisaged by it were held on the same day; No further elections would be held simultaneously across the island of Ireland until 1979, when representatives of the Republic of Ireland and Northern Ireland to the European Parliament were elected. The next local elections were held in 1924 in Northern Ireland and in 1925 in the Irish Free State.

Background
In the 1918 general elections the newly reformed Sinn Féin party had secured a large majority of Irish seats in the Parliament of the United Kingdom. Because many seats won by Sinn Féin were uncontested, and the elections used the first-past-the-post voting system, Sinn Féin in all  seats gained slightly less than 50% of the vote. This electoral success provided a propaganda coup for Sinn Féin, and so the British Government introduced the Local Government (Ireland) Act 1919, which allowed for parliamentary elections by proportional representation in all of Ireland for the first time, by the system of the single transferable vote for multi-member electoral areas. The Bill's second reading debate and vote were on 24 March. The government hoped that the new system would reveal less-than-monolithic support for Sinn Féin, and it was first tested in the 1920 local elections.

Some Sinn Féin members including Arthur Griffith had also helped to form the Proportional Representation Society of Ireland in the different circumstances of 1911. By 1920 the party was in a far stronger electoral position, and had no reason to oppose proportional representation, and it treated these elections as internal Irish elections for local authorities that were expected to swear allegiance to the new Irish Republic.

The electoral method introduced by the 1919 Act is still used in elections in the Republic of Ireland and most elections in Northern Ireland today.

January 1920
The 1919 act mandated elections for all urban councils except Sligo Corporation, which had been reconstituted and elected in 1919. The cumulative first preference votes in the 1920 urban elections were:

Excluding the more unionist province of Ulster, the urban results were:

The 15 January elections saw Sinn Féin, Labour, and other nationalists winning control of 172 of Ireland's 206 borough and urban district councils. The subsequent mayoral elections on 30 January saw a Unionist elected for Belfast, a Nationalist in Derry, Labour in Wexford, and Sinn Féin in eight boroughs.

In Westport, only 4 candidates were nominated for the 18 seats on the urban district council, and only 2 of those accepted office. Since 5 councillors was a quorum, Mayo County Council mandated a special election for 15 March, but only one extra candidate was nominated.

June 1920
The rural elections showed a much greater level of support for Sinn Féin in its core support area. It took control of 338 out of 393 local government bodies, county councils, boards of guardians and rural district councils across the whole island. The county and rural district elections saw virtually no contests outside of Ulster.

Sinn Féin's success allowed them to take control of virtually every county council and rural district council outside of Ulster. Sinn Féin success in 12 June rural and county elections extended even to Ulster, with the party winning control of 36 of Ulsters 55 rural districts.

Results

Detailed results by council type

County councils

County Borough councils

Urban district councils

References

Sources

Citations

 
Ireland
Council elections in the Republic of Ireland by year
Politics of Ireland (1801–1923)
Irish War of Independence
January 1920 events
June 1920 events
Local